Afroturbonilla engli is a species of sea snail, a marine gastropod mollusk in the family Pyramidellidae, the pyrams and their allies. This species is one of three other species within the Afroturbonilla genus, with the exception of the others being Afroturbonilla hattenbergeriana and Afroturbonilla multitudinalis.

References

External links
 To World Register of Marine Species

Pyramidellidae
Gastropods described in 1997